Sundale is an unincorporated community in Muskingum County, in the U.S. state of Ohio.

History
A post office called Sun Dale was established in 1880, and remained in operation until 1920. Besides the post office, Sundale had a railroad depot.

References

Unincorporated communities in Muskingum County, Ohio
1880 establishments in Ohio
Populated places established in 1880
Unincorporated communities in Ohio